Xena, Saskatchewan was a village in Saskatchewan.  The last building was demolished in the 1970s.  It is now an unincorporated area in the rural municipality of Morris No. 312, in the Canadian province of Saskatchewan.  Xena is located on Highway 2 in central Saskatchewan.

History
Xena was part of the Grand Trunk Pacific Railway's (later the Canadian National Railway) alphabetical naming system, appearing between Watrous, Young, and Zelma. Consequentially, it is the only railway station in Western Canada ever to begin with the letter X.

Demographics
The population of an unincorporated area is so small, that the census enumerates the residents as a part of the rural municipality.

Attractions
Manitou District Regional Park is located within .

See also
List of communities in Saskatchewan
List of rural municipalities in Saskatchewan
Hamlets of Saskatchewan

Notes

Ghost towns in Saskatchewan
Morris No. 312, Saskatchewan